Tulla GAA is a Gaelic Athletic Association club based in Tulla, County Clare, Ireland.  It is affiliated with the Clare county board.

History
The club was founded in 1885, making it the oldest club in County Clare. The club's grounds are named Páirc an Dálaigh, after Dr. Tommy Daly.

Achievements
 Munster Senior Club Hurling Championship Runners-Up: 2007
 Clare Senior Hurling Championship (11): 1889, 1896, 1897, 1898 (as Carrahan), 1899, 1900 (as Carrahan), 1905, 1913, 1933, 1975 (as Brian Boru's with Bodyke & Killanena), 2007
 Clare Intermediate Hurling Championship Winners 1979
 Clare Junior Hurling Championship Runners-Up 2000
 Clare Minor Hurling Championship Winners 2000

Notable players

 Philip Brennan
 Jack Coughlan
 Dr. Tommy Daly
 Jim Houlihan
 Amby Power
 Joe Power
 Andrew Quinn
 Brian Quinn
 David McInerney

References

 Club community page

Hurling clubs in County Clare
Gaelic football clubs in County Clare
Gaelic games clubs in County Clare